The Journal of Legal Studies is a law journal published by the University of Chicago Press focusing on interdisciplinary academic research in law and legal institutions.

It emphasizes social science approaches, especially those of economics, political science, and psychology. The journal was established in 1972. Richard Posner was a founding editor.

References

External links 
 

English-language journals
Biannual journals
University of Chicago Press academic journals
Publications established in 1972
Law journals